Joseph and Potiphar's Wife is a c. 1555 oil on canvas painting by Jacopo Tintoretto, now in the Museo del Prado, in Madrid. The story of Joseph and Potiphar's wife is from the Old Testament.

It was bought with five other biblical paintings for Philip IV of Spain by Diego Velázquez during his second visit to Venice. The viewpoint suggests that it could have adorned a ceiling. It is now in the Museo del Prado in Madrid.

See also
Joseph and Potiphar's Wife (disambiguation)

References

1555 paintings
Nude art
Paintings by Tintoretto
Paintings of Joseph and Potiphar's Wife
Paintings of the Museo del Prado by Italian artists